FK Slovan Ivanka pri Dunaji is a Slovak football team, based in the town of Ivanka pri Dunaji. The club was founded in 1919. In year 2009 FK Slovan Ivanka pri Dunaji merged with club FO Trnávka.

References

External links 
Official website 

Football clubs in Slovakia
FK Slovan Ivanka pri Dunaji
Association football clubs established in 1919
FK Slovan Ivanka pri Dunaji